The Swazi Cup  is the top knockout tournament of the Swazi football. It was created in 1980.

Winners
1969 : Mbabane Highlanders
1976 : Mbabane Highlanders
1977 : ?
1978 : ?
1978 : ?
1980 : Bulembu Young Aces
1982 : Bulembu Young Aces
1983 : Mbabane Highlanders
1984 : Manzini Wanderers
1985 : Mbabane Highlanders
1986 : Mbabane Swallows
1988 : Denver Sundowns (Manzini)
1989 : Moneni Pirates FC (Manzini)
1990 : Mbabane Highlanders
1991 : Denver Sundowns (Manzini)
1992 : Denver Sundowns (Manzini) 2-0 Royal Leopards (Simunye)
1993 : Eleven Men in Flight (Siteki) 2-1 Denver Sundowns (Manzini)
1994 : Juventus Kwaluseni
1995 : Mhlambanyatsi Rovers
1997 : Mbabane Highlanders
1998 : ?
1999 : Mbabane Highlanders
2000 : Mhlume United
2001 : Eleven Men in Flight (Siteki) 1-1 (4 - 3) Mbabane Swallows
2004 : Green Mamba FC (Simunye) 5-1 Denver Sundowns (Manzini)
2005 : Hub Sundowns FC 2-0 Malanti Chiefs (Pigg's Peak)
2006 : Mbabane Swallows 1-0 (a.p.) Malanti Chiefs (Pigg's Peak)
2007 : Royal Leopards 1-0 Manzini Sundowns
2008 : Malanti Chiefs (Pigg's Peak) 2-1 Royal Leopards
2009 : Mbabane Highlanders 2-1 Manzini Wanderers
2010 : Mbabane Highlanders 1-0 Umbelebele Jomo Cosmos FC
2011 : Royal Leopards 4-3 (aet) Mhlambanyatsi Rovers
2012 : Green Mamba FC 3-1 Mbabane Highlanders
2013 : Mbabane Swallows 5-3 (aet) Malanti Chiefs
2014 : Royal Leopards 3-1 Young Buffaloes
2015 : Moneni Pirates 2-0 Manzini Wanderers
2016 : Mbabane Swallows 2-1 Green Mamba FC (Simunye)
2017 : Young Buffaloes 2-0 Matsapha United
2018 : Young Buffaloes 2-1 Manzini Wanderers
2019 : Young Buffaloes 1-0 Royal Leopards

External links
Swaziland - List of Cup Winners, RSSSF.com

Football competitions in Eswatini
National association football cups
Recurring sporting events established in 1980
1980 establishments in Swaziland